Katrina Ann Johnson (born April 27, 1982) is an American actress.

Born in San Diego, California, she starred on Nickelodeon's All That sketch comedy show from 1994 to 1997.  As part of the show's original cast, she played characters such as the "Lemonade Scammer". She also did impressions of Roseanne Barr and Ross Perot in many episodes. Johnson returned for the 100th episode, along with fellow All That alumni Angelique Bates, Lori Beth Denberg, and Alisa Reyes. She also returned for the All That 10th Anniversary special.

During her time on All That, Johnson was also performing stand-up comedy at the Laugh Factory in Los Angeles.

Johnson reunited with several of her former cast members on All That at the 2011 Comikaze Expo. As of 2014, Johnson lived in Las Vegas where she hosted an online radio show, Uncensored Radio's Guilty Pleasures, although the show has been  the air since 2015. Uncensored Radio was rebooted with multiple shows in 2020 with a video component as well as an audio option.

Filmography 
 All That (1994–1997)
 All That (1 episode, 1999)
 All That 10th Anniversary Reunion Special (2005) as herself
 Sisters (2006) (uncredited)
• Uncensored Reality (2012) as herself

References

External links 
 

1982 births
Living people
20th-century American actresses
21st-century American actresses
Actresses from San Diego
American child actresses
American film actresses
American television actresses